South Carolina Highway 560 (SC 560) is a  state highway in the U.S. state of South Carolina. The highway connects Cross Hill and Kinards.

Route description
SC 560 begins at an intersection with SC 39 (Main Street) in Cross Hill, within Laurens County. It enters White Plains Crossroad and travels to the east and northeast before it crosses North Campbell Creek. It crosses over Mill Creek and then curves to the east. It crosses over Watkins Creek and curves to the southeast. The highway crosses over the Little River and enters the Belfast Wildlife Management Area. Approximately  later, it begins traveling along the Newberry County line, along which it travels for the rest of its length. SC 560 crosses over Quaker Creek, Garrison Creek, Workman Branch, and Bush River before it enters Kinards. There, it crosses over some railroad tracks and meets its eastern terminus, an intersection with U.S. Route 76 (US 76). Here, the highway continues as County Line Road and immediately enters Sumter National Forest.

Major intersections

See also

References

External links

SC 560 at Virginia Highways' South Carolina Highways Annex

560
Transportation in Laurens County, South Carolina